Nepheronia thalassina, the Cambridge vagrant, is a butterfly of the family Pieridae. It is found in afrotropical Africa.

The wingspan is 50–55 mm for males and 55–60 mm for females. Adults are on the wing year-round, peaking from February to May.

The larvae feed on Hippocrates obtusifolia, Hippocrates africana, and Jasminium spp.

Subspecies
N. t. thalassina (Boisduval, 1836) (Senegal, the Gambia, Guinea, Sierra Leone, Liberia, Ivory Coast, Ghana, Togo, Benin, Nigeria)
N. t. sinalata (Suffert, 1904) (Sudan, Ethiopia, Uganda, Kenya, Tanzania, Malawi, Zambia, eastern and northern Zimbabwe, northern Botswana, northern Namibia, Eswatini, South Africa)
N. t. verulanus (Ward, 1871) (Cameroon, Congo, Democratic Republic of the Congo, western Uganda, northern Angola, northern Zambia)

References

Seitz, A. Die Gross-Schmetterlinge der Erde 13: Die Afrikanischen Tagfalter. Plate XIII 15

Butterflies described in 1836
thalassina
Butterflies of Africa
Taxa named by Jean Baptiste Boisduval